Samurai Gunn is a 2D action video game developed by Beau Blyth and Doseone and originally published by Maxistentialism (though it is currently being self-published). The game was released for Microsoft Windows in 2013, OS X in 2015, and a planned PlayStation 4 and PlayStation Vita version were announced but never released due to creator Beau Blyth working on Hyper Light Drifter. A sequel, Samurai Gunn 2, was released in early access via Steam on 20 July 2021, and is currently in development for Microsoft Windows, Nintendo Switch, and PlayStation 5.

Gameplay
Samurai Gunn is a local multiplayer game that supports 2 to 4 players utilising melee and shooting mechanics as well as platforming.
Players are armed with a sword and gun with only three bullets per life. A match typically consists of players defeating each other with one hit with an attack with either their sword or a bullet. Both swords and bullets can be deflected by other players with precise timing.

Development
Teknopants' Beau Blyth came up with the concept of Samurai Gunn while watching Tommy Wiseau's film The Room and in his boredom exclaimed to his friend Jake that he would make a game. His friend replied, "Samurais. With guns."
Development of the game started the same night, in which Blyth had a working prototype running with most of the basic features. The core game was produced within a week while the full game took half a year to develop.

Reception

Samurai Gunn received positive reviews from most critics.

References

External links

2013 video games
Action video games
Cancelled PlayStation 4 games
Cancelled PlayStation Vita games
Japan in non-Japanese culture
Multiplayer video games
Platform fighters
Retro-style video games
Indie video games
Windows games
MacOS games
Video games about samurai
Video games developed in the United States
Video games set in feudal Japan